The Château de Caumale is a castle in Escalans, Landes, Nouvelle-Aquitaine, France. It was completed in the 12th century.

Buildings and structures completed in the 12th century
Châteaux in Landes (department)